A dead pool, also known as a deadpool or death pool, is a game of prediction which involves guessing when someone will die. Sometimes it is a bet where money is involved.

Modern application 
In the early 20th century, dead pools were popular in dangerous sports such as motorsport, for example the first edition of the Indianapolis 500.

Variants 
A typical modern dead pool might have players pick out celebrities who they think will die within the year. Most games start on January 1 and run for 12 months, although there are some variations on game length and timing. 

In 2000, website Fucked Company claimed to be a "dot-com dead pool" which invited users to predict the next Internet startups to fail during that era's dot com bust. The site itself folded in 2007 after a long history as a target for strategic lawsuits against public participation by companies.

Because of the high body count in the first seven seasons of the popular fantasy television series Game of Thrones, dead pools were launched for its final season.

Application in contemporary society 
Britain's premier dead pool in recent years has been the Derby Dead Pool, which has run for over 25 years and received an article detailing its players on the BBC website.

The Rotten.com Dead Pool, formerly largest in the world, uses NNDB as its source of qualified celebrities, and as arbiter of their life status. 

The concept and success strategies are also detailed in a (previously) annual guide called The Dead Pool, written by KQRS-FM radio personality Mike Gelfand and author Mike Wilkinson. KQRS-FM in Minneapolis/St. Paul, Minnesota also does an annual on air dead pool contest, where show hosts and listeners will attempt to pick which celebrity will die in that calendar year.

In his AP news article "Some say death pools are in poor taste" (which brought national attention to The Old Blue Eyes Celebrity Death Watch), author Matt Sedensky writes, "Players scour newspapers and Web sites for news on celebrities' health; they rely on tips from insiders; and they consider a public figure's lifestyle, absence of recent appearances and rumors of illness."

In popular culture
A dead pool is a key plot element of the 1988 final installment of the Dirty Harry film series, The Dead Pool. Harry investigates the players, when several people listed in a game of dead pool die in suspicious circumstances.

The Marvel Comics character Deadpool (first appearing in 1991) takes his name after escaping from Ajax and Dr. Killebrew, who formed their own dead pool based on which of their experimental subjects would die first. In the 2016 film Deadpool, the titular character takes his hero name from a dead pool of mercenaries, himself included, who are regular patrons at his favorite bar.

In the MTV show Teen Wolf, the main plotline of Season 4 (2014) revolves around a dead pool specifically targeting the supernaturals of Beacon Hills, which is set up by a mysterious character named The Benefactor.

See also
Assassination market
Tontine
Policy Analysis Market

References 

Death
Gambling games
Prediction markets